Guzmania monostachia is an epiphytic species in the genus Guzmania. Also known as a West Indian tufted airplant, this species is native to South America (Bolivia, Brazil, Colombia, Ecuador, Peru, Venezuela), Central America, the West Indies and Florida. The species is also reportedly naturalized in Hawaii.

Guzmania monostachia is notable as it is a facultative CAM species, converting from C3 photosynthesis to CAM under high light treatment or drought stress as a protective measure.

Cultivars
 Guzmania 'Premier Amour'

Gallery

References

External links
US Department of Agriculture plants profile
Atlas of Florida Vascular Plants, West Indian Tufted Airplant,  Guzmania monostachia
Zipcodezoo Guzmania_monostachia, photo of herbarium specimen collected in Costa Rica
Hawaii Tropical Botanical Garden, Guzmania monostachia
Tropical Plant Book, Guzmania monostachia in Ecuador

monostachia
Flora of South America
Flora of the Caribbean
Flora of Central America
Flora of Florida
Plants described in 1753
Taxa named by Carl Linnaeus
Flora without expected TNC conservation status